Lisa M. Dietlin (born August 20, 1963) is an internationally recognized expert and author on philanthropy, charitable giving, and transformational change in both the personal and professional arenas. A leading figure in the American nonprofit sector, her deep experience with fundraising and the nonprofit sector, groundbreaking research on giving patterns, and influential ideas on transformational philanthropy have led her to become one of the most trusted philanthropic advisors in the nation, making numerous appearances on TV and radio.

Speaker and Coach

As founder of The Institute of Transformational Philanthropy, Lisa’s conviction that anyone can be an agent for positive change by Making A Difference® in their own life has made her a highly sought after keynote speaker, lauded for delivering compelling and practical tools for personal growth, goal achievement, and maintaining a healthy work/life balance full of “happiness and joy” to a wide range of audiences across all industries.

Lisa is an in-demand coach and instructor, having provided strategic guidance to over 1000 organizations, as well as to entrepreneurs, corporate leaders, and nonprofit boards and staffs to help them enact transformational change at the individual, structural, and national levels. Lisa serves as adjunct faculty at Chicago’s Northwestern University, DePaul University, and North Park University, as well as helming training seminars for clients ranging from Fortune 500’s and international charitable organizations to community-based nonprofits.

Author

Lisa has authored several books on the subjects of change and growth, including Transformational Philanthropy: Entrepreneurs and Nonprofits; the Making a Difference: 365 Tips, Ideas, and Stories to Change Your World series; The Power of Three: How To Achieve Your Goals By Simply Doing Three Things A Day; and the autobiographical I Got Hit By A Taxi But You Look Run Over: Life Lessons about Happiness and Joy.

Awards and Recognitions

In 2019, Lisa was named as one of the top 20 Most Inspiring Chicagoans by StreetWise magazine and was cited as a “Remarkable Woman” by the Chicago Tribune. Lisa’s other awards and recognitions include the Distinguished Graduate Award from Alpena Community College, a Certificate of Appreciation from the Association of Donor Relations Professionals, and induction into the Alpena High School Hall of Fame. Lisa serves on the Advisory Board of the Metropolitan Capital Bank and Trust, and for three years she served as a National Judge for the Tom’s of Maine "50 States for Good" annual charity recognition award.

Education

A native of Michigan, Lisa holds undergraduate degrees from Michigan State University and Alpena Community College, and a Master’s Degree in Philanthropy and Development from Saint Mary’s University of Minnesota.

Early life 
Dietlin was born in Alpena, Michigan, and spent her childhood in Michigan and Montana.  Her father died when she was 13, and she and her siblings were raised by her mother.  After graduating from Alpena High School and Alpena Community College, Dietlin earned a degree from Michigan State University.  She received a Master of Arts degree in Philanthropy and Development from St. Mary's University of Minnesota.  Dietlin served as the President for the Michigan Young Democrats, and then was the Legislative Services Specialist for the Michigan State University Senate from 1986-1991.

Career 
At Michigan Technological University, Dietlin served as Associate Director of Corporate Relations, Director of Major Gifts and Senior Advancement Director.  She moved to Chicago in 1998 and worked as Assistant Dean of Development at University of Illinois at Chicago and an adjunct professor at North Park University.

In 2000, Dietlin founded Lisa M. Dietlin & Associates, Inc. in Chicago, and served as President and CEO.  LMDA worked to create philanthropic strategies for its clients, mainly entrepreneurs and non-profit organizations. Dietlin served on the Board of the Ms. Foundation  and WomenOnCall.

Dietlin's first book, Transformational Philanthropy: Entrepreneurs and Nonprofits, was published in 2010.  She later authored three more books, the Making A Difference series, which provides tips, ideas and stories about creating positive impact through giving.     Two additional books authored by Lisa are The Power of Three: How to achieve your goals by simply doing three things a day and I Got Hit By a Taxi but You Look Run Over: Life Lessons about happiness and joy.

Dietlin was featured by the Chicago Tribune in their ebook Remarkable Women: Interviews with Inspiring Chicagoland Women  In 2013 she was named one of the Top 50 Singles by Today's Chicago Woman magazine.  She has also named as a SheSource expert on strategic fundraising, philanthropy, nonprofits, media and entertainment.

Dietlin has been a guest on many television and radio programs including NBC., CBS, Fox News, Better TV, WGN Radio, Oprah & Friends Radio  NPR and First Business, giving information and ideas about how to get involved in charitable work.  She appeared regularly on CBS 2 as its Chicago Charity Contributor, and was a national judge for the Tom’s of Maine "50 States for Good" charity recognition awards for several years. Dietlin has also contributed articles to, and been featured and quoted in various newspapers  and magazines and in The Chronicle of Philanthropy. She has been a regular Huffington Post contributor through her blog "Making A Difference®: The World of Giving".

Selected publications

Books
Transformational Philanthropy: Entrepreneurs and Nonprofits 2010
The Power of Three: How to achieve your goals by simply doing three things a day
I Got Hit By a Taxi but You Look Run Over: Life Lessons about happiness and joy.
Making A Difference - 365 Tips, Ideas and Stories to Change Your World.
Making A Difference 2 - More Tips, Ideas and Stories to Change Your World.
Making A Difference 3 - Still More Tips, Ideas and Stories to Change Your World.

Articles
 Conscious Magazine (February 2016) "Breaking Up The Winter Doldrums: Volunteer or Virtually Volunteer Options"
 University World News (2016) "Philanthropy For Social Leadership"
 HuffPost Blog Post (June 2015) "Making A Difference®: The World of Giving – US Charitable Giving Surpasses All Past Records in 2014" 
 HuffPost Blog Post (November 2013) "Making A Difference®: The World of Giving – 50 STATES FOR GOOD" Announces Those Organizations Doing the Most Good
 HuffPost Blog Post (August 2012) "Making A Difference®: The World of Giving -- More Inspiration Right After the Olympics
 Today’s Chicago Woman (December 2011) "Women’s Role in Philanthropy"

References

External links
Official Website ~ LISADIETLIN.com 
The Institute Of Transformational Philanthropy (founded by Lisa Dietlin) 
 Huffington Post (2013) Making A Difference: A World of Giving  
 SheSource (2013)  
Women on Call
 StreetWise 

1963 births
Living people
People from Alpena, Michigan
Michigan State University alumni
Saint Mary's University of Minnesota alumni
Writers from Michigan